Morogues is a commune in the Cher department in the Centre-Val de Loire region of France.

Geography

Population

Sights
 The church of St. Symphorien, dating from the twelfth century.
The fifteenth-century chateau of Maupas.
 A watermill, the “Moulin Quenouille”.

See also
Communes of the Cher department

References

External links

Official website of Morogues 

Communes of Cher (department)